Gilbert Bodart (born 2 September 1962) is a Belgian football manager and former player.

Playing career
Bodart was born in Ougrée, Belgium. A goalkeeper, he played a long time with Standard Liège. Bodart also played 12 times with Belgium from 1986 to 1995. In 1996 the goalkeeper moved to the French team of Girondins de Bordeaux.

He played few matches with the national team as he was in competition with Jean-Marie Pfaff and then with Michel Preud'homme. Bodart was nevertheless part of the team in the 1986 World Cup of which Belgium reached the semifinals. He collected 12 caps in 55 selections.

Managerial career
He worked as a manager for La Louvière in the Jupiler League from 2005 until 21 February 2006.

Personal life
Bodart is the uncle of the Belgian goalkeeper and youth international Arnaud Bodart.

In August 2008, Bodart was arrested for his involvement in a robbery at the Caves of Han where he had been working in the marketing team since July. Het Laatste Nieuws reported he had been the informant of the robber. It was revealed Bodart had financial problems due a gambling habit. He was also suspected of counterfeiting.

In June 2018 Bodart was reported to have made death threats against former teammate Eric Gerets after Gerets had started a relationship with his former girlfriend.

Honours 
Standard Liège
 Belgian First Division: 1981–82, 1982–83
 Belgian Cup: 1980–81, 1992–93
 European Cup Winners' Cup: runner-up 1981–82

Belgium
 FIFA World Cup: fourth place 1986

Individual
 Belgian Goalkeeper of the Year: 1985, 1986, 1992, 1995

References

External links
 
 

1962 births
1986 FIFA World Cup players
1990 FIFA World Cup players
Walloon people
Footballers from Liège Province
Belgian expatriate footballers
Belgian Pro League players
Belgian football managers
Belgian footballers
Belgium international footballers
People from Seraing
Brescia Calcio players
Expatriate footballers in France
Expatriate footballers in Italy
FC Girondins de Bordeaux players
Association football goalkeepers
K.S.K. Beveren players
Ligue 1 players
Serie B players
Living people
Standard Liège players
R.A.A. Louviéroise managers
Ravenna F.C. players
C.S. Visé managers
K.V. Oostende managers
S.C. Eendracht Aalst managers
Belgian expatriate sportspeople in France
Belgian expatriate sportspeople in Italy